Susumu Katsumata may refer to:
Susumu Katsumata (footballer), Japanese footballer
Susumu Katsumata (manga artist), Japanese manga artist